This is a list of artworks in the Eskenazi Health Art Collection, most of which are located in the Sidney and Lois Eskenazi Hospital. The collection began in the early part of the 20th century and was greatly expended when the new hospital was opened in 2013. A number of the artworks have been nationally recognized for excellence, and the collection is considered part of a healing environment.

References

Culture of Indianapolis
Eskenazi Health Art Collection
Art in Indiana